Ranvir Shorey is an Indian actor and former VJ who works in Hindi films and television. Since making his debut in Ek Chhotisi Love Story (2002), he has starred in a number of high-profile films such as Jism (2003) and Lakshya (2004). He has also starred in the critically acclaimed films such as Traffic Signal, Bheja Fry (2007) and the critical and commercial hit Mithya (2008).

Career 
He started his career along with his friend and co-actor Vinay Pathak. He was the host of the successful talk show Ranvir Vinay Aur Kaun? and The Great Indian Comedy Show which aired on STAR One.

He made his debut opposite Manisha Koirala in the film Ek Chhotisi Love Story (2002). His next film Jism (2003) was a hit but he had a minor role. It was not until 2006 that he got noticed in the comedy Khosla Ka Ghosla. The film was released to much acclaim and his comic role was praised. He played Nanoo in the comedy Pyaar Ke Side Effects alongside Rahul Bose as his funny friend. He appeared in the multi-starrer Honeymoon Travels Pvt. Ltd. (2007) which was moderately successful. He appeared in a Yash Raj Films, titled Aaja Nachle which was released in November 2007. Mithya, which was released in February 2008, has Ranvir Shorey as the lead actor and has been critically acclaimed. In 2008, Ranvir was seen in movies like Ugly Aur Pagli and box office hit Singh Is Kinng.

He hosted Jhalak Dikhhla Jaa (season 7) in the year 2014. Which aired on Colors (TV channel).

In 2018, he starred in the short film Shame alongside Swara Bhaskar. He also appeared in the 2019 film Sonchiriya alongside Sushant Singh Rajput, Ashutosh Rana and Manoj Bajpayee.

Ranvir Shorey starrer Kadakh is a brilliant dark comedy which leaves the audiences glued to the screens.

Early and personal life 
 
He did his early schooling from Dayanand Model Sr. Secondary School, Jalandhar. He is a close friend of actor and director Rajat Kapoor and actor Vinay Pathak. Ranvir Shorey used to date Pooja Bhatt, but he ended up marrying his longtime girlfriend actress Konkona Sen Sharma on 3 September 2010. The couple, who got engaged in 2008, reportedly exchanged wedding vows in an intimate ceremony at their Goregaon residence.  The Times of India reported that his wife, Konkona, gave birth to their first child, Haroon, on 15 March 2011 at a South Mumbai hospital. The couple later separated after five years of marriage. They still continue to remain friends and share the custody of their son.

Filmography

Films

Television

Awards and nominations

Filmfare Awards

Gold Awards

Miscellaneous awards

References

External links 

 
 
 

Indian male film actors
Living people
Male actors in Hindi cinema
Indian television presenters
People from Jalandhar
Year of birth missing (living people)
Indian VJs (media personalities)
Fear Factor: Khatron Ke Khiladi participants